This is a list of airlines that are based in Ontario which have an air operator's certificate issued by Transport Canada, the country's civil aviation authority.

Current airlines

Defunct airlines

References 

Aviation in Ontario

Ontario
Airlines